Sherman Township, Nebraska may refer to the following places:

Sherman Township, Antelope County, Nebraska
Sherman Township, Cuming County, Nebraska
Sherman Township, Gage County, Nebraska
Sherman Township, Kearney County, Nebraska
Sherman Township, Platte County, Nebraska

See also
Sherman Township (disambiguation)

Nebraska township disambiguation pages